Gold Afternoon Fix is the sixth album by the Australian alternative rock band the Church, released in April 1990. It was their second album for Arista Records in the US and was expected to capitalise and build on the success of 1988's Starfish. The album saw considerable promotion upon its release, but despite moderate success in the US, with the single "Metropolis" reaching the top of the Modern Rock Tracks chart, the release failed to deliver mass commercial appeal.

Following their tour for the Starfish album in 1988, the band members went home for a four-month break before reconvening to begin work on the next album. Arista demanded demos of all the tracks before the official recording process could begin. These demos were recorded in Sydney at Fat Boy Studios by a young engineer by the name of Cameron Howlett. The band was tired of the material by the time the recording sessions commenced in late 1989. Further difficulties arose when the band wanted ex-Led Zeppelin bassist John Paul Jones to produce, but the record label wanted to team the band again with L.A. session musician Waddy Wachtel and engineer Greg Ladanyi, not wanting to change what had been a winning formula. Arista feared a Jones/Church collaboration might turn out too arty and non-commercial and vetoed the venerable musician in favour of the safer (and commercially tested) Wachtel, although Ladanyi was left out. Band members repeatedly noted how much they had disliked recording Starfish. That album's song "North, South, East And West" had been an indictment of Los Angeles' shallower aspects.

The recording sessions for the album were particularly fraught and in-band tensions led to drummer Richard Ploog being ostracised. While some of the bare, open sound that characterised Starfish punctuates the recording, the use of programmed drums instead of Ploog's live performances on all but four tracks resulted in the album being criticised as somewhat stiff and cold. According to biographer Robert Dean Lurie, the demo recordings for Gold Afternoon Fix were more successful than the finished album, despite their roughness. Ploog left the group for good following the recording and former Patti Smith Group drummer Jay Dee Daugherty was brought in for the tour.

Despite the album's title, Steve Kilbey was not yet using heroin at this point. He only started smoking (not fixing) the drug after the subsequent tour, having been introduced to it by Grant McLennan of the Go-Betweens. The title actually derives from a stock market term relating to the daily price which is set for gold.

The album is unique among the Church's releases in the absence of any 12-string electric guitar. The missing trademark sound was due to guitarist Marty Willson-Piper's 12-string Rickenbacker having been stolen during the previous tour.

Track listing

All songs written by Kilbey/Koppes/Ploog/Willson-Piper except where noted.
 "Pharaoh" (3:54)
 "Metropolis" (4:44)
 "Terra Nova Cain" (Kilbey/Willson-Piper) (5:10)
 "City" (3:22)
 "Monday Morning" (2:47)
 "Russian Autumn Heart" (4:08)
 "Essence" (5:16)
 "You're Still Beautiful" (3:09)
 "Disappointment" (Kilbey/Koppes/Willson-Piper) (6:13)
 "Transient" (Kilbey/Koppes/Willson-Piper) (4:27)
 "Laughing" (4:35)
 "Fading Away" (3:38)
 "Grind" (6:07)

A 3-track EP entitled Megalopolis was included with U.S. promo copies, which contained:
 "Metropolis" (4:44)
 "Monday Morning (edit)" (2:44)
 "Much Too Much"  (3:50)

2005 EMI Australia Remaster

This edition included a second disc which contained:
 "Much Too Much" (3:52)
 "Take It Back" (4:04)
 "Desert" (2:50)
 "Forgotten Reign" (4:21)
 "Dream" (2:57)
 "Ride Into The Sunset" (Kilbey/Koppes) (4:32)
 "You Got Off Light" (3:30)
 "The Feast" (Kilbey/Jansson/Koppes/Ploog/Willson-Piper) (4:49)
 "Metropolis (acoustic)" (4:19)
 "Grind (acoustic)" (5:38)
 All of these tracks, except the two acoustic versions, had appeared on the 1991 rarities compilation A Quick Smoke at Spot's: Archives 1986-1990.

Personnel
Steve Kilbey: lead vocals, bass guitar, keyboards
Peter Koppes: guitars, lead vocal on "Transient"
Marty Willson-Piper: guitars, lead vocal on "Russian Autumn Heart"
Richard Ploog: drums, percussion (1, 5, 6 & 9)

Notes 

1990 albums
The Church (band) albums
Albums produced by Waddy Wachtel
Arista Records albums